Thomas Koep (born 15 September 1990 in Cologne) is a German cyclist, who currently rides for Team Embrace The World Cycling.

Major results
2010
 7th Overall Mainfranken-Tour
2011
 2nd Overall Tour de Berlin

References

External links
 
 
 

1990 births
Living people
German male cyclists
Cyclists from Cologne